Imre Harangi (16 October 1913 – 4 February 1979) was a Hungarian amateur lightweight boxer. He placed second at the 1934 European Championships and won a gold medal at the 1936 Summer Olympics in a close final against Nikolai Stepulov of Estonia. Harangi lost the first round and had his both eyes swollen and bleeding, yet he managed to outperform Stepulov in the remaining two rounds.

1936 Olympic results
Below are the results of Imre Harangi, a Hungarian boxer who competed in the lightweight division of the 1936 Berlin Olympics:

 Round of 32: bye
 Round of 16: defeated Robert Seidel (Switzerland) on points
 Quarterfinal: defeated Jose Padilla Jr. (Philippines) on points
 Semifinal: defeated Poul Kopa (Denmark) on points
 Final: defeated Nikolai Stepulov (Estonia) on points (won gold medal)

References

1913 births
1979 deaths
Lightweight boxers
Olympic boxers of Hungary
Boxers at the 1936 Summer Olympics
Olympic gold medalists for Hungary
Olympic medalists in boxing
Hungarian male boxers
Medalists at the 1936 Summer Olympics
Sportspeople from Hajdú-Bihar County
20th-century Hungarian people